Steven Carl Bradley (born July 16, 1963) is a former American football quarterback in the National Football League (NFL). He was drafted by the Cincinnati Bengals and played for the Chicago Bears. He played college football for the Indiana Hoosiers.

Indiana Hoosiers

Passing

Rushing

Chicago Bears

References

1963 births
Living people
American football quarterbacks
Chicago Bears players
Indiana Hoosiers football players